Glauco was one of five s built for the  (Royal Italian Navy) during the early 1900s. The boat served in World War I and ceased service in 1916.

Design
The  of small submarines, designed by Cesare Laurenti, was the first class of submarines to be built for the Italian Navy, following the 1890 experimental submarine . The submarines of the class displaced  on the surface and  submerged.

Glauco was armed with three 450 mm (17.7 in) torpedo tubes. This differed from the remaining submarines of the class, which were only fitted with two torpedo tubes. The submarine's crew was 2 officers and 13 other ranks.

Construction and career
Glauco was laid down on 1 July 1903 at the Regio Arsenale (the Navy shipyard) at Venice, was launched on 9 July 1905 and was completed on 15 December that year. Glauco entered in service in December as a training ship in the Adriatic Sea. The Glaucos were still largely experimental submarines, and were known as Benzinari (petrol burners) owing to their power plants.

In August 1914 the submarine was assigned to the 4th Submarine Division based in Venice and was commanded by Lieutenant P. Tolosetto Farinata degli Uberti. On 24 May 1915, when Italy entered the First World War, Glauco, still part of the 4th Submarine Division, was based at Brindisi.

In 1916 Glauco was first deployed to Taranto, forming a separate unit combined with sister submarine  and later in May was based in Valona in Albania.

In August of the same year the submarine was disarmed and deployed in Taranto until 1921, when she was eventually sold to Romanian Maritime Lloyd.

Throughout the war, the Glauco had carried out a total of 65 defensive missions in the sea between Bari, Barletta and Valona, for a total of 296 hours of surface navigation and 252 diving.

References

Bibliography

External links
 Glauco Marina Militare website

1905 ships
World War I submarines of Italy
Ships built by Venetian Arsenal
Glauco-class submarines (1905)